"I'm Not Through Loving You Yet" is a song written by Holly Dunn, Tom Shapiro and Chris Waters, and recorded by American country music artist Louise Mandrell.  It was released in March 1984 as the first single and title track from the album I'm Not Through Loving You Yet.  The song reached number 7 on the Billboard Hot Country Singles & Tracks chart.

Chart performance

References

1984 singles
Louise Mandrell songs
Songs written by Tom Shapiro
Songs written by Chris Waters
Songs written by Holly Dunn
RCA Records singles
Song recordings produced by Eddie Kilroy
1984 songs